Conus cordigera is a species of sea snail, a marine gastropod mollusk in the family Conidae, the cone snails and their allies.

Like all species within the genus Conus, these snails are predatory and venomous. They are capable of "stinging" humans, therefore live ones should be handled carefully or not at all.

Description
The size of the shell varies between 30 mm and 72 mm.

Distribution
This marine species occurs off the Philippines and Eastern Indonesia

References

  Petit, R. E. (2009). George Brettingham Sowerby, I, II & III: their conchological publications and molluscan taxa. Zootaxa. 2189: 1–218
 Puillandre N., Duda T.F., Meyer C., Olivera B.M. & Bouchet P. (2015). One, four or 100 genera? A new classification of the cone snails. Journal of Molluscan Studies. 81: 1–23

External links
 The Conus Biodiversity website
 Cone Shells – Knights of the Sea
 

cordigera
Gastropods described in 1866